Luke Moran is an American filmmaker and actor. He is best known for his work on the feature film Boys of Abu Ghraib (2014).

Career
Moran began his career producing Listen to Your Heart, a 2010 independent film starring Cybill Shepherd and Moran's brother Kent Moran. In 2010, he began his own production company Rebel One Pictures with the purpose of producing his own feature films. Boys of Abu Ghraib was the first, released in select theaters on March 28, 2014, and was also Moran's directorial debut.

Filmography

References

External links
 

Living people
American male screenwriters
American film producers
American film directors
American male film actors
Year of birth missing (living people)